Bahamas participated at the 2017 Summer Universiade, in Taipei, Taiwan with 4 competitors in 1 sport.

Competitors 
The following table lists Bahamas' delegation per sport and gender.

Medal summary

Swimming

References

Nations at the 2017 Summer Universiade
2017 in Bahamian sport